Dorycera graminum is a species of picture-winged fly in the genus Dorycera of the family Ulidiidae found in
Croatia, Corsica, the United Kingdom, Austria, Germany, Italy, Hungary, Poland, Portugal, Slovakia, and Spain.

References

graminum
Insects described in 1794
Diptera of Europe